Walter Assef (May 31, 1913 – January 14, 1988) was a Canadian politician, and former Vaudevillian, who served as mayor of the city of Thunder Bay, Ontario. He was the first, and Until 2022 Where Ken Boshcoff was elected for a discontinuous term, the only mayor, to have been elected for two discontinuous terms. He was first elected in 1973 and served until 1978. His second term began when he was re-elected in 1981 and lasted until 1985.

Walter Melund Assef was born May 31, 1913 at Sioux Lookout, Ontario to John Hunna Khaleefy Asseff, a native of Hasroun, Lebanon, and Maria Rosa Penteado (variant spelling, Mary Penteado), a native of Brazil. He died January 14, 1988.

Liberace dined at the home of Walter Assef before performing at the Fort William Gardens on 30 September 1961.

As mayor, his nickname was "Jolly Wally". Reportedly, Prince Philip coined the term, referring to him as "that jolly little mayor from Thunder Bay". His predecessor as mayor Saul Laskin did not see him that way - he found him disruptive and uncooperative. By his second term in office, many observers deplored his behaviour in council as abusive.

One of the issues he campaigned strongly against was the building of a stand-alone arts complex in the city. When the Community Auditorium (as it's now known) was built, Walter Assef vowed to never attend the grand opening or ever step inside. A populist, Assef once campaigned with a cow.

Bibliography
 Peter Raffo, "Municipal political culture and conflict of interest at the Lakehead, 1969–1972," Thunder Bay Historical Museum Society Papers and Records, 26 (1998), 26-45.

References 

1913 births
1988 deaths
Mayors of Thunder Bay
Canadian people of Lebanese descent
People from Sioux Lookout